Bellevue Mountain, located in northern Dominica, has an elevation of 1,903 ft.

References

Mountains of Dominica